The Eternity Man is a 2008 tele-film adaptation of the opera The Eternity Man by composer Jonathan Mills and librettist Dorothy Porter.

The film follows the life of Arthur Stace. The film was a co-production of ABC Television and Channel 4, and won a Rose d'Or.

References

External links
 

2008 television films
2008 films
Films based on operas
2000s English-language films